Kevin Dowling may refer to:
 Kevin Dowling (bishop) (born 1944), South African Roman Catholic bishop
 Kevin Dowling (darts player) (born 1965), English darts player
 Kevin Dowling (director), American film and television director and producer